Ruppia, also known as the widgeonweeds, ditch grasses or widgeon grass, is the only extant genus in the family Ruppiaceae, with eight known species. These are aquatic plants widespread over much of the world. The genus name honours Heinrich Bernhard Rupp, a German botanist (1688-1719). They are widespread outside of frigid zones and the tropics.

Description
The leaf is simple and not rhizomatous. They can be annual (commonly) or perennial (rarely); stem growth is conspicuously sympodial, but sometimes is not. These species are adapted to be in brackish water (and salt marshes). The leaves are small or medium-sized. Their disposition can be alternate, opposite, or whorled (usually alternate except when subtending an inflorescence). Even, lamina keep entire and are setaceous or linear. The leaf just shows one vein without cross-venules. Stomata are not present. The mesophyll leaks calcium oxalate crystals. The minor leaf veins do not present phloem transfer cells and leaks vessels.

These plants have stems without secondary thickening and xylem without vessels. The sieve-tube plastids are P-type. The root xylem does not present vessels.

These plants are hermaphroditic, with anemophilous or hydrophilous pollination. The flowers are ebracteate, small, and regular. Commonly, the flowers are aggregated in ‘inflorescences’, but sometimes they are solitary. Often, they grow in racemes, spikes, or umbels. The scapiflorous inflorescences  are terminal, in short spikes, or subumbelliform racemes, sometimes one- or few-flowered. They do not have hypogynous disks. These flowers do not have perianth absent, except when small staminal appendages are regarded as perianth segments. The androecial members are all equal. The androecium just presents two fertile stamens with sessile anthers dehiscing by longitudinal slits. The pollen is polysiphonous and its grains are  three-celled and nonaperturate.
The gynoecium (2–)4(–16) is superior, carpelled, and euapocarpous. The carpel is not stylate, apically stigmatic with the stigma peltate, or umbonate. These flowers only present one ovule pendulous, nonarillate, campylotropous, bitegmic, and crassinucellate. The placentation is apical and embryo-sac development is of the polygonum type. Before fertilization, they fuse polar nuclei. The fruit is drupaceous and fleshy, forming an aggregate. The fruiting carpel is indehiscent, commonly on a long, spirally twisted peduncle, with each drupelet becoming very long-stalked. The fruit contains one nonendospermic seed with starch. The embryo can be straight  or slightly curved. Membranous testa do not have phytomelan.

Taxonomy
The Cronquist system of 1981 placed the family in order Najadales of subclass Alismatidae in class Liliopsida [=monocotyledons] in division Magnoliophyta [=angiosperms].

The APG II system of 2003 (unchanged from the APG system of 1998) does recognize such a family and places it in the order Alismatales, in the clade monocots.

According to the AP-Website the family is doubtfully distinct from the family Cymodoceaceae: the plants in the three families Cymodoceaceae, Posidoniaceae, and Ruppiaceae form a monophyletic group.

A genus-level taxonomy was briefly revised by Zhao and Wu, including the following species in the world:
species
 Ruppia bicarpa - Western Cape, South Africa
 Ruppia cirrhosa* - temperate regions: Europe, Asia, north + south (but not tropical) Africa, North America, West Indies, Argentina *The name is a homotypic synonym of R. maritima
 Ruppia didyma - Mexico, West Indies
 Ruppia drepanensis - western + central Mediterranean
 Ruppia filifolia - southern South America, Falkland Islands
 Ruppia maritima - seashores and lakeshores around the world
 Ruppia megacarpa - Australia, New Zealand, Asia (Korea, Japan, and Russia)
 Ruppia occidentalis - Canada, USA
 Ruppia polycarpa - Australia, New Zealand (incl Chatham Islands)
 Ruppia spiralis - seashores and lakeshores around the world
 Ruppia tuberosa - Australia

Marine grasses families: Zosteraceae, Cymodoceaceae, Ruppiaceae and Posidoniaceae. Related families: Potamogetonaceae, Zannichelliaceae (not consistently).

Phylogeny and evolution
The first molecular phylogeny of the monogeneric family discerned three distinct species, R. tuberosa, R. megacarpa, and R. polycarpa, and one species complex comprising six lineages. The species complex, named R. maritima complex, was later updated as a group of eight lineages. These studies revealed that multiple hybridization and polyploidy events as well as chloroplast capture have occurred in the evolution of the genus.

Phytochemistry
These plants present an anatomy non-C4 type. Seven labdanes have been identified from this genus: 
 ent-14,15-Dinor-8(17)-labden-13-one
 Methyl ester of (ent-12S)-15,16-Epoxy-12-hydroxy-12-oxo-8(17),13(16),14-labdatrien-19-oic acid.  
 (-)-15,16-epoxy-8(17),13(16),14-labdatrien-19-ol.
 Methyl ester of (-)-15,16-epoxy-8(17),13(16),14-labdatrien-19-oic acid.   
  (-)-15,16-Epoxy-8(17),13(16),14-labdatrien-19-al.
 (-)-15,16-Epoxy-8(17),13(16),14-labdatrien-19-yl acetate 
 (ent-13E)-8(17),13-Labdadien-15-ol

Three steroids have been also isolated:
 (3β,5α,6β,7α,22E,24R)-Ergosta-8(14),22-diene-3,6,7-triol.
 (3β,5α,6β,7α,22E,24R)-Ergosta-8,22-diene-3,6,7-triol
 (24R)-Ergost-4-ene-3,6-dione.

References

External links

 Ruppiaceae in the Flora of North America
 NCBI Taxonomy Browser
 links at CSDL, Texas

 
Brackish water plants
Alismatales genera